Fusibacter bizertensis is a bacterium from the family Peptostreptococcaceae. Fusibacter bizertensis was identified from a corroded kerosene storage tank.

References

Bacteria described in 2015
Peptostreptococcaceae